Panama Sal is a 1957 American musical comedy film directed by William Witney and written by Arnold Belgard. The film stars Elena Verdugo, Ed Kemmer, Carlos Rivas, Harry Jackson, Joe Flynn and Christine White. The film was released on October 18, 1957 by Republic Pictures.

Plot
Three wealthy American playboys and pals fly to South America for a final fling before one of them, Dennis, is to be married. His fiancee Patricia uses the time to fly to France to have a wedding dress designed by Henri Moray.

The plane runs out of fuel, making a forced landing in the wilds of Panama. There the three men have a chance encounter with a singer, beautiful Sal Regan, who immediately catches Dennis's rapt attention. Claiming to be a music producer, Dennis invites her to return to Los Angeles with him. Although this upsets Manuel Ortego, a jealous man who loves her, Sal decides to settle the matter on the flip of a coin. Dennis wins.

Ensconced in a Beverly Hills apartment, Sal enjoys the trip until Dennis tries to remake her entire image, including wardrobe and makeup, toning it down. A nightclub singing date is arranged and the news makes it abroad to Patricia, who angrily begins a romantic fling with Moray.

Ortego travels to California to demand Sal return to Panama and to confront Dennis, who proposes another wager, that he be given two weeks to make her a star. Patricia also turns up and announces herself to be about to marry Dennis, just to annoy Sal. In the end, though, Sal's debut musical performance is a sensation, and she and Dennis end up in love.

Cast       
Elena Verdugo as Sal Regan
Ed Kemmer as Dennis P. Dennis
Carlos Rivas as Manuel Ortego
Harry Jackson as Peter Van Fleet II
Joe Flynn as Barrington C. Ashbrook
Christine White as Patricia Sheldon
Albert Carrier as Moray
Jose Gonzales-Gonzales as Peon
Billie Bird as Woman Manager

References

External links 
 

1957 films
American drama films
1957 drama films
Republic Pictures films
Films directed by William Witney
1950s English-language films
1950s American films